Kingscourt Stars is a Gaelic Athletic Association club from Kingscourt, County Cavan in Ireland. They are affiliated to Cavan GAA. The club was founded in 1890. They are the fourth most successful team in Cavan GAA history, winning 11 Senior Championships, their latest occurring in 2015.

Notable players
Pádraig Faulkner
Victor Sherlock

Honours
 Cavan Senior Football Championship (11): 1921, 1980, 1981, 1986, 1987, 1989, 1990, 1991, 1993, 2010, 2015
 Cavan Intermediate Football Championship (1): 1976
 Cavan Junior Football Championship (3): 1931, 1954, 1961
 Cavan Under-21 Football Championship (2): 1979, 1982
 Cavan Minor Football Championship (4): 1957, 1982, 1997*, 2011* (*O'Raghallaigh Gaels (Kingscourt/Shercock))

References

External links
Kingscourt Stars Official Website
Official Cavan GAA Website
Cavan Club GAA

Gaelic games clubs in County Cavan
Gaelic football clubs in County Cavan